The following table groups the list of notable Andalusians listed in alphabetical order within categories:

Bullfighters

Explorers and Conquistadors

Leaders and politicians

Musicians

Sculptors and painters

Philosophers and humanists

Sportspeople

Writers

References

+
Andalusia
Andalusians